Darbar Sahib literally means the Imperial Court, and often refers to the main room within a Gurdwara. This room is where Sache Patshah  Sri Guru Granth Sahib Ji sits on a raised throne, or takht in a prominent central position.

Darbar Sahib - Diwan Hall
Darbar Sahib Worship takes place in the Diwan Hall (prayer hall). In the Diwan Hall, there are people playing worship hymns from the Guru Granth Sahib. The Guru Granth Sahib is the highest spiritual authority in Sikhism and is to be treated as though it is a living Guru. People visiting the Gurdwara sit on the floor often cross-legged, as pointing your feet towards an object or person, in this case, the Guru Granth Sahib Ji, may be mistaken as disrespectful according to cultural norms. It is also the traditional and optimal posture for deep meditation. Furthermore, sitting on the floor is seen as a symbol of equality among all people. Rather than some people standing, some people sitting on chairs and some people sitting on the floor, everybody sits on the floor to show that nobody is higher in status than anybody else.

Traditionally, women and children, and men sit on opposite sides of the diwan hall. However, seating in a mixed pattern is in no way prohibited. 
 
The Guru Granth Sahib is placed on pillows, which have beautiful cloths draped over them, which are on a raised platform that has a canopy. The cloths, called romallas, cover the Guru Granth Sahib when it is not being read.

This is at the front of the diwan hall. Also in the diwan hall, there is another platform where musicians (called the Ragis) sit and play their instruments while the congregation are singing hymns. Music is an important part of Sikh worship because it helps when people are singing hymns that are written in the Guru Granth Sahib. The hymns that are written in the Guru Granth Sahib are called Gurbani, which means: The words of the guru.

See also 

 Sikh architecture

References

Sikh terminology
Sikh architecture